Hingham is an unincorporated census-designated place located in the town of Lima, in Sheboygan County, Wisconsin, United States, northeast of Adell and southeast of Waldo. It has a post office with ZIP code 53031. As of the 2010 census, its population was 886.

History
Hingham was platted on September 5, 1850, by Edward Hobart. The land was acquired from Mrs. David Giddings, who had bought it from the U.S. government in 1846. Streets on the original plat included Water, Center, Spring, South and Main. It was named after Hingham, Massachusetts.

References

Census-designated places in Sheboygan County, Wisconsin
Census-designated places in Wisconsin